The World Group Play-offs were four ties which involved the losing nations of the World Group first round and the winning nations of the World Group II. Nations that won their play-off ties entered the 1999 World Group, while losing nations joined the 1999 World Group II.

Slovakia vs. Belgium

Russia vs. Germany

Croatia vs. Netherlands

Czech Republic vs. Italy

References

See also
Fed Cup structure

World Group Play-offs